The American three-toed woodpecker (Picoides dorsalis) is a medium-sized woodpecker (family Picidae), which is native to North America.

Description
It closely resembles the black-backed woodpecker, which is also three-toed. Until recently, it was considered to be the same species as the Eurasian three-toed woodpecker, P. tridactylus. Adults are black on the head, wings and rump, and white from the throat to the belly; the flanks are white with black bars. The back is white with black bars and the tail is black with the white outer feathers barred with black. The adult male has a yellow cap.

Breeding
The breeding habitat is coniferous forests across western Canada, Alaska and the western and extreme northeastern United States. It has also been breeding in various spots in Michigan's upper peninsula, and has been recorded breeding in Minnesota five times. The female lays 3 to 7 but most often 4 eggs in a nest cavity in a dead conifer or sometimes a live tree or pole. The pair excavates a new nest each year. Three-toed woodpeckers rely on disturbed, old-growth forests and are strongly associated with active spruce beetle infestations, with beetle-infested trees being important for the woodpeckers and other species that depend on the cavities they excavate.

Movements and foraging
This bird is normally a permanent resident, but northern birds may move south and birds at high elevations may move to lower levels in winter. Three-toed woodpeckers forage on conifers in search of wood-boring beetle larvae or other insects. They may also eat fruit and tree sap. These birds often move into areas with large numbers of insect-infested trees, often following a forest fire or flooding. This bird is likely to give way to the black-backed woodpecker where the two species compete for habitat.

Subspecies
Picoides dorsalis dorsalis, nominate Western race.
Picoides dorsalis fasciatus, Rocky Mountain race.

Notes

References

External links
 
 Photos, videos and observations at Cornell Lab of Ornithologys Birds of the World
 Three-toed woodpecker Information – USGS Patuxent Bird Identification InfoCenter
 

American three-toed woodpecker
Native birds of Alaska
Birds of Canada
Native birds of the Northwestern United States
Native birds of the Rocky Mountains
American three-toed woodpecker
American three-toed woodpecker
Taxobox binomials not recognized by IUCN